Ádám György (born 28 January 1982) is a Hungarian pianist. György started his music studies at the age of four. While studying under Katalin Halmagyi, he was accepted to the Béla Bartók Conservatory of Budapest in 1994. György won the National Youth Piano Competition in 1998 and the Hungary's Pianist 2000 award two years later. From 2000 to 2006, Ádám attended the Franz Liszt Academy of Music in Budapest, where he studied under György Nador and Balázs Reti. Currently, he is pursuing graduate studies at the Franz Liszt Academy, and he is director of the Adam György Castle Academy. On 8 June 2012 he performed at the opening ceremony of the UEFA Euro 2012 in Warsaw, Poland.

Awards 
 2004 – First International Chopin Piano Competition in Budapest: First Prize, Grand Prize and Special Prize
 2003 – San Remo International Piano Competition: "Special Prize"
 2002 – The Prix Classic Vienna (Wiener-Klassik-Preis)
 2000 – Pianist Award 2000, for the Pianist of Year in 2000 in Hungary /Bela Bartok Conservatory/
 1998 – 1st prize at National Youth Piano Competition, Hungary

Recordings 
Ádám György, Concert in Budapest (2005)
Ádám György, Plays the Piano (2006)
Ádám György, Plays Bach and Mozart (2008)
Ádám György, Live in Budapest (DVD HD) (2008)
Ádám György, Live in Budapest, BLU-RAY (2009) 
Adam Gyorgy, The Carnegie Hall Concert CD (2016)

References

External links 
 
 Ádám György’s Official Fan Club

Living people
1982 births
21st-century Hungarian musicians
Hungarian pianists
Hungarian male musicians
Place of birth missing (living people)
Franz Liszt Academy of Music alumni
People from Pomáz